Hemiphragma may refer to:
 Hemiphragma (bryozoan), an extinct genus of bryozoans in the family Dittoporidae
 Hemiphragma (plant), a genus of plants in the family Plantaginaceae